Hawkhurst Moor was a cricket ground at Hawkhurst in Kent. The first recorded match on the ground was in 1825, when a Kent side played one from Sussex. This was one of two matches held on the ground which were given retrospective first-class cricket status, the second occurring the following year between the same two sides. The exact location of the ground is unknown.

References

Defunct cricket grounds in England
Hawkhurst
Cricket grounds in Kent
Defunct sports venues in Kent
Sports venues completed in 1825
1825 establishments in England